G1/S-specific cyclin-E1 is a protein that in humans is encoded by the CCNE1 gene.

Function 

The protein encoded by this gene belongs to the highly conserved cyclin family, whose members are characterized by a dramatic periodicity in protein abundance through the cell cycle. Cyclins function as regulators of CDK. Different cyclins exhibit distinct expression and degradation patterns which contribute to the temporal coordination of each mitotic event. This cyclin forms a complex with and functions as a regulatory subunit of CDK2, whose activity is required for cell cycle G1/S transition. This protein accumulates at the G1-S phase boundary and is degraded as cells progress through S phase. Overexpression of this gene has been observed in many tumors, which results in chromosome instability, and thus may contribute to tumorigenesis. This protein was found to associate with, and be involved in, the phosphorylation of NPAT protein (nuclear protein mapped to the ATM locus), which participates in cell-cycle regulated histone gene expression and plays a critical role in promoting cell-cycle progression in the absence of pRB. Two alternatively spliced transcript variants of this gene, which encode distinct isoforms, have been described. Two additional splice variants were reported but detailed nucleotide sequence information is not yet available.

Interactions 

Cyclin E1 has been shown to interact with:

 CDC25A, 
 CDKN1B, 
 CUL3 
 Cdk1, 
 Cyclin-dependent kinase 2, 
 HERC5, 
 P21,
 Retinoblastoma-like protein 2,  and
 SMARCA4.

See also 
 Cyclin E

References

Further reading 

 
 
 
 
 
 
 
 
 
 
 
 
 
 
 
 
 
 
 

Cell cycle regulators